"Novacaine" is a song by American alternative metal band 10 Years. It was their first single off of their eighth studio album (How to Live) As Ghosts. It peaked at number 5 on the Billboard US Mainstream Rock Songs chart.

Background
The song was first released on August 16, 2017, as the first single from the band's eighth studio album, (How to Live) As Ghosts. A music video was released on September 26, 2017.

Themes and composition
Lyrically, Hasek explained that the song is about the loss of enthusiasm people go through as they transition from youth to adulthood. He described: 

The track was described as one of three key tracks from the album that deal with issues of mortality and mankind.

Journalists noted that the song still generally sounded like 10 Year's alternative metal sound, but with more of an alternative rock edge to it. The song was noted as being less aggressive than the songs of their prior album, From Birth to Burial, and not as epic as their biggest single, "Wasteland", but that it still contained Hasek's soaring vocals over a big guitar sound. Loudwire described the song as a "driving rocker with...guitar pulsing through the track... Jesse Hasek's voice...powering the song with a rather atmospheric and triumphant feel in the chorus as he really opens it up."

Music video
The song's music video reflects the song's lyrical content of being stuck in life through a scenario similar to the film Groundhog Day. In the video, the main character, a business man, appears to have his life together, with a nice job, living place, and car, but feels like he's in a slump living the same boring day over and over again. Additionally, he continues to encounter random strangers that keep saying "dead as dead can be" to him.

Personnel
10 Years
 Jesse Hasek – vocals
 Brian Vodinh – guitar, drums
 Matt Wantland - guitar

Production
 Nick Raskulinecz - production

Charts

References

2017 singles
2017 songs
10 Years (band) songs
Songs written by Jesse Hasek